The Tuscahoma Formation is a geologic formation in Mississippi. It preserves fossils dating back to the Paleogene period.

See also

 List of fossiliferous stratigraphic units in Mississippi
 Paleontology in Mississippi

References
 

Paleogene Mississippi
Mississippi placenames of Native American origin